The 1930 NCAA baseball season, play of college baseball in the United States organized by the National Collegiate Athletic Association (NCAA) began in the spring of 1930.  Play largely consisted of regional matchups, some organized by conferences, and ended in June.  No national championship event was held until 1947.

Conference changes
Six northeastern schools formed the Eastern Intercollegiate Baseball League, a forerunner of the Ivy League.  These teams were: Columbia, Cornell, Dartmouth, Penn, Princeton, and Yale.

Conference winners
This is a partial list of conference champions from the 1930 season.

Conference standings
The following is an incomplete list of conference standings:

References